The Anavryta Experimental Gymnasium, also simply referred to as Anavryta is an experimental, co-educational, public gymnasium located in the area of Maroussi in Athens, Greece. It is in the same complex as the Anavryta Experimental Lyceum.

External links
Official Website

Schools in Greece
Marousi